Centinela Hospital Medical Center is a non profit hospital located in Inglewood, California United States.

History
The hospital serves 369 beds, and also offers a level II emergency department, orthopedic care, advanced cardiac services, peripheral artery disease treatment and OB/GYN services.

Prime Healthcare Services
Prior to being purchased by Prime Healthcare Services in 2007, the hospital was linked to the Daniel Freeman Campus.

References

External links

 Centinela Hospital Medical Center website
  Centinela Hospital California Healthcare Atlas

Hospital buildings completed in 1924
Hospitals in Los Angeles County, California
 
Inglewood, California